Bellinge  may refer to:
 Bellinge, an area in Billing, Northamptonshire, England
 Bellinge, Denmark, a village in Odense, Denmark